Gunnar Már Guðmundsson (born 15 December 1983) is an Icelandic retired footballer, currently working for Fjölnir as a part of the staff.

References

External links
 
 

1983 births
Living people
Gunnar Mar Gudmundsson
Gunnar Mar Gudmundsson
Gunnar Mar Gudmundsson
Gunnar Mar Gudmundsson
Association football midfielders